Lichen Ears is an EP by New Zealand band The Ruby Suns, featuring a number of songs from the same sessions that produced the band's 2008 album Sea Lion. It was released in 2007 exclusively on Auckland's Lil' Chief Records as a limited pressing of 300 copies.

Track listing

External links
Lil' Chief Records: The Ruby Suns
Lil' Chief Records
The Ruby Suns on MySpace

2007 EPs
The Ruby Suns albums
Lil' Chief Records EPs